The Hostivické Ponds are a natural monument located at the western edge of Prague, about 4 km from Zličín in the municipalities of Hostivice, Břve and Litovice. This small-scale protected area was established on 14 October 1996 by the District Office of Western Prague with the aim of the conservation of natural communities of the Hostivické pond system.

In the adjacent wetlands and forests rare and endangered species of plants and animals can be found. During the reign of Rudolf II the fishponds in the area served as a source of water for Prague Castle.

In 1972 rare fungus Haasiella venustissima, previously found in only two localities in Czechoslovakia, was found in the area. Also found in the reeds are tufted sedge (Carex cespitosa), bistort (Persicaria bistorta) and great burnet (Sanguisorba officinalis). In the past western marsh orchids and black poplars, could be found, but they have not been seen in recent years.

History

Litovická valley attracted to the settlement as early as the Neolithic (New Stone Age). The oldest settlement in Hostivice ponds is supported by the present village on the hill and at the top Břve Krahulov. The mere mention of Hostivice dates from the 14th century. All three villages united under one domain Gothard Zdarsky Zdar from around 1640.

From a historical perspective, it was important that the pond system served as the source region of water for water supply, supplying the Prague Castle during the reign of Rudolf II.

On the shore of the pond Břevského was then built camp, which was subsequently abandoned. Currently, the buildings in the camp removed. This area is often used for illegal waste disposal. Natural Monument Hostivické ponds was established in 1996 and since that time the development of its old Czech Union for Nature Conservation, in particular its basic organization in Hostivice.

Literature
 Kotlaba F., Pouzar J. (2003): Mushrooms natural monuments Hostivické ponds near Prague. – Bohemia centralis, 26: 225–236, Prague
 Špryňar P. (1999): Notes from an excursion CBS the 29 maggio 1999. – Miss
 Hostivice 1998 Anthology of nature, the places and the history of the city. Czech Republic Union for Conservation of Nature Hostivice
  
 

Geography of the Czech Republic
Protected areas of the Czech Republic